Bedananda Jha was a Nepalese politician. In 1951 he founded the Nepal Terai Congress, seeking autonomy for the Terai region. Later he became an important politician during the panchayat period. He was a cabinet minister at several times. Jha was also chairman of the Back-to-the-Village National Campaign and ambassador to India.

Jha died on January 21, 2006. He was chairman of the Rajsabha standing committee at the time.

References

Government ministers of Nepal
2006 deaths
Nepalese diplomats
Ambassadors of Nepal to India
Nepal Terai Congress politicians
Year of birth missing